Mr. India is a motion simulator ride at the Adlabs Imagica amusement park located in Khopoli, Mumbai, India. Manufactured by E2M technologies, the ride takes riders through the entire journey of Imagica in a wondrous car, where the riders will be helping the host, Mr. India,  to fight the iconic Bollywood villain, Mogambo.

Characteristics 

This ride consists of three pre-shows that load at three different levels. Each pre-show has a door that opens on queue to load each of the three the main show levels. Each main show level has three cars that seat 16 guests. Hence each main show level has the capacity of 48 guests.Total capacity of the attraction is 144 guests per show.

Car 

Mr. India operates with 9 steel and fiberglass cars at 3 different levels. Each car has four rows  that can seat four riders in a single row, for a total of 16  riders per car i.e. 48 riders at each level; each row has its own individual leg bar restraint. The structure of the cars are colored yellow and black; the seats are black and the restraints are silver.

Reception 

The Creative director for Adlabs Entertainment Limited, Aarti Shetty said,"Mr. India is a star attraction in the park simply because of the recall value the film generates to this day. And our technology has brought the film alive. The old-world charm with the new-age tech makes the same experience fresher and more relevant. ‘Mr. India’ has achieved cult status among a wide target audience and that is why we acquired it much earlier. When we were looking for a film for this great motion base experience we immediately realized it was fortuitous.”

References

External links

 
 E2M Technologies - Manufacturers of Adlabs Imagica Mr India Motion Simulator Ride
 About Adlabs Imagica

Simulator rides
Amusement rides introduced in 2013
Amusement rides manufactured by E2M Technologies
Tourist attractions in Maharashtra